A seed is a competitor or team in a sport or other tournament who is given a preliminary ranking for the purposes of the draw. Players/teams are "planted" into the bracket in a manner that is typically intended so that the best do not meet until later in the competition, usually based on regular season. The term was first used in tennis, and is based on the idea of laying out a tournament ladder by arranging slips of paper with the names of players on them the way seeds or seedlings are arranged in a garden: smaller plants up front, larger ones behind.

Sometimes the remaining competitors in a single-elimination tournament will be "re-seeded" so that the highest surviving seed is made to play the lowest surviving seed in the next round, the second-highest plays the second-lowest, etc.  This may be done after each round, or only at selected intervals.

Tennis

Professional tennis tournaments seed players based on their rankings. The number of seeds varies from tournament to tournament. Generally the bigger the event the more seeds there tend to be relative to lesser events. The 4 major (Grand Slam) tournaments progressively expanded from 8-seed format to 16-seed, then to the current 32-seed format, which was adopted in the middle of the 2001 season, after French Open champion Gustavo Kuerten had complained that clay-court specialists were at a disadvantage with just 16 seeds.

In a tennis event, one version of seeding is where brackets are set up so that the quarterfinal pairings (barring any upsets) would be the 1 seed vs. the 8 seed, 2 vs. 7, 3 vs. 6 and 4 vs. 5. However, most tennis tournaments follow a different procedure, in which the 1 and 2 seeds are placed in separate brackets, but then the 3 and 4 seeds are assigned to their brackets randomly, and so are seeds 5 through 8, and so on. This may result in some brackets consisting of stronger players than other brackets. A further randomization derives from the fact that the top 32 players only are seeded in Tennis Grand Slam tournaments: therefore it is conceivable that the 33rd best player in a 128-player field could end up playing the top seed in the first round. A good example of this occurring was when World No. 33 Florian Mayer was drawn against (and eventually defeated by) then-World No. 1 Novak Djokovic in the first round of the 2013 Wimbledon Championships, in what was also a rematch of a quarter-final from the previous year. Rankings of tennis players, based on a history of performance, tend to change positions gradually, and so a more "equitable" method of determining the pairings might result in many of the same head-to-head match-ups being repeated in successive tournaments. 

An example is given hereafter of a seeded 16-team bracket with no upsets  (note that sums of the two seed numbers in each match are equal within a round: 17 for First round, 9 for Quarterfinals, 5 for Semi-finals):

Other sports
In American team sports, the NFL playoffs and WNBA playoffs employ re-seeding, the NBA playoffs and the NCAA Division I men's basketball tournament do not, the Stanley Cup Playoffs used re-seeding between 1975 and 1981 and again from 1994 and 2013, the MLS Cup Playoffs used reseeding until 2018, and the MLB postseason does not have enough teams where re-seeding would make a difference in the matchups.

In some situations, a seeding restriction will be implemented; from 1975 until 1989 in the NFL and from 1998 until 2011 in MLB there was a rule where in the first round should the top seed and wild card be from the same division, they would not play each other; in those cases, the top seed played the third seed and the second seed played the wild card team.

Association football 
Seeding in major tournaments is commonplace. The FIFA World Cup has employed seeding since it was first established in 1930. The FIFA World Rankings introduced in 1992 have been part of the seeding since the 1998 tournament. Nations from the same confederation are kept apart where possible.

Seeding of clubs in the UEFA Champions League was introduced in 1992–93 for the preliminary round and extended to the full tournament from 1994–95. The UEFA coefficients for national associations and individual clubs are used to determine the seedings; the coefficient for national teams is similarly used for seeding the UEFA European Championship. These coefficients are based on results in UEFA competitions over the previous five seasons. 

There is limited seeding in the FA Cup, in that clubs from higher divisions enter the draw at later rounds, but are not kept apart within that round. The third round proper, when top divisions enter, typically features a few matchups between Premier League sides.

References 

Tournament systems
Sports terminology